Rashid Shaheed (born August 31, 1998) is an American football wide receiver for the New Orleans Saints of the National Football League (NFL). He played college football at Weber State and signed with the Saints as an undrafted free agent in 2022.

High school career

Had 3,748 total yards and 24 touchdowns at Mt. Carmel High School in San Diego, California from 2013 to 2016.  Earned second team all-state honors.  Set the school record for most receiving yards in a game and had the longest kick return in school history.  Shaheed also ran track and field and was a two-time California section champion.

College career

Shaheed played college football at Weber State from 2017 to 2021.  The only player in school history to earn All-American honors four times. Shaheed set the FCS all-time record for career kickoff return touchdowns with seven. Had a 100-yard return in WSU’s 2021 win over Northern Arizona.  

Finished his career at Weber State with 5,478 all-purpose yards, ranked as the third most in WSU history.  Was seventh in career receiving yards with 2,178 yards and 18 touchdowns.  Ranked 10th in school history for career receptions with 147. Really shined as a kick returner with an average of 29.1 yards per return. Shaheed was also third in career punt return yardage.

Professional career
 
On May 2, 2022, Shaheed signed with the New Orleans Saints as an undrafted free agent.

On August 30, 2022, Shaheed was released by the Saints, and signed to the team's practice squad the next day. October 15, 2022, he was signed to the Saints' active roster. On October 16, 2022, in his NFL debut, he had a 44-yard rushing touchdown on his first career touch. On October 20, 2022, in his second career game, he caught a 53-yard touchdown pass from quarterback Andy Dalton.

References

External links
New Orleans Saints bio
Weber State Wildcats bio

1998 births
Living people
American football wide receivers
Weber State Wildcats football players
New Orleans Saints players
Players of American football from Phoenix, Arizona
Players of American football from San Diego